In enzymology, a dihydropyrimidine dehydrogenase (NADP+) is an enzyme that catalyzes the chemical reaction

5,6-dihydrouracil + NADP+  uracil + NADPH + H+

Thus, the two substrates of this enzyme are 5,6-dihydrouracil and NADP+, whereas its 3 products are uracil, NADPH, and H+.

In humans the enzyme is encoded by the DPYD gene. It is the initial and rate-limiting step in pyrimidine catabolism. It catalyzes the reduction of uracil and thymine. It is also involved in the degradation of the chemotherapeutic drugs 5-fluorouracil and tegafur. It also participates in beta-alanine metabolism and pantothenate and coa biosynthesis.

Terminology 
The systematic name of this enzyme class is 5,6-dihydrouracil:NADP+ 5-oxidoreductase. Other names in common use include:
 dihydrothymine dehydrogenase
dihydrouracil dehydrogenase (NADP+)
4,5-dihydrothymine: oxidoreductase
DPD
DHPDH
dehydrogenase, dihydrouracil (nicotinamide adenine dinucleotide, phosphate)
DHU dehydrogenase
hydropyrimidine dehydrogenase
dihydropyrimidine dehydrogenase (NADP+)

Structural studies

Function
The protein is a pyrimidine catabolic enzyme and the initial and rate-limiting factor in the pathway of uracil and thymidine catabolism. Genetic deficiency of this enzyme results in an error in pyrimidine metabolism associated with thymine-uraciluria and an increased risk of toxicity in cancer patients receiving 5-fluorouracil chemotherapy.

Interactive pathway map

See also 
 Dihydropyrimidine dehydrogenase deficiency, a genetic disorder
Cancer pharmacogenomics

References

Further reading 

 
 
 
 
 
 
 
 
 
 
 
 
 
 
 
 
 
 
 
 

EC 1.3.1
NADPH-dependent enzymes
Enzymes of known structure